I Love the World, also known as I Love the Whole World, is an advertising campaign launched by Discovery Channel in 2008 in promotion of their new tagline: "The World is Just... Awesome". The song used in the ad is a re-writing of a traditional camping song known as "I Love the Mountains"  or "I Love the Flowers", likely adapted from the tune of "Heart and Soul", featuring a chorus of "boom-de-yah-da, boom-de-yah-da". In May of 2020, Discovery Channel released an updated version of the piece, called “The World Is Still Awesome” on their YouTube Channel.

Cast and visuals with lyrics

The cast and visuals of the ads are numerous, as it features many hosts and famous scenes/locations from various Discovery Channel shows. There are also several alternate versions of the commercials where some visuals were replaced; the new visuals in those versions are indicated. There are currently two ads in the campaign, the first released in 2008 called "I Love the World", and the second released in November 2009 called "The World is Just Awesome".

I Love the World (2008)

Short version

Canadian long version

An alternate version was commissioned for CTVgm-based Discovery Channel, with clips representing series appearing exclusively on that network replacing generic clips and clips for shows exclusive to the American version.

Canadian short version

The World is Just Awesome (2009)

Short version

Canadian long version

Canadian short version

The World is Still Awesome (2020)

The World is Still Awesome TikTok Version (2020)

Full credits

SourceJames Rouse at Spyfilms.com

Awards

 Silver Award at the 2008 London International Awards in the "Media Promotion" category.

References

External links
 Official Discovery Channel Version
 Official Video Download
 Official MP3 Download
 Official 72andSunny Page for "I Love the World" campaign
 "I Love the World" YouTube release
 30-second version
 Canadian Version
 Lyrics for "I Love The Mountains" or "BoomDeAhDah"
 TikTok Version Of The 2020 Version

Discovery Channel
2008 works
2008 neologisms
American television commercials
Viral videos
American advertising slogans
Advertising campaigns